Charles O'Brien, 7th Viscount Clare, titular Earl of Thomond (1757-1774) was a Franco-Irish nobleman.

He was born on 18 October 1757 in Paris, France, the son of Charles O'Brien, 6th Viscount Clare, maréchal de Thomond and Marie Genevieve Louise Gauthier de Chifreville. He was Colonel-proprietor of the Clare Regiment after his father, but died before assuming effective command. O'Brien died unmarried at 17 of natural causes on 29 December 1774 in Paris. 

1757 births
1774 deaths
O'Brien dynasty
Irish chiefs of the name
Thomond